The Mahtam are a clan found among the Punjabis of India and Pakistan. They practice Hindu, Sikh and Muslim religions.

During British rule in India, they were stigmatised under the Criminal Tribes Act 1871.

References

Punjabi tribes
Social groups of Punjab, India
Sikh communities
Denotified tribes of India
Social groups of Punjab, Pakistan